Classica Sarda was a road bicycle race that took place on the Italian island Sardinia. It was held after the Giro di Sardegna from 1948 until 1983.

During this period, it was organized under different names, like GP Alghero from 1965 to 1967, Monte Urpino in 1975 and Cagliari-Sassari in 1951, 1980 and 1982.

The race reappeared again on the cycling calendar in 2010 as Classica Sarda Olbia-Pantogia (from Olbia to Pantogia) as a 1.1 event on the UCI Europe Tour.

In 2011, its final edition was organized as the Classica Sarda Sassari-Cagliari.

Winners
Source

Notes

References

External links 
Official site 

UCI Europe Tour races
Cycle races in Italy
Recurring sporting events established in 2010
2010 establishments in Italy
Defunct cycling races in Italy
2011 disestablishments in Italy
Recurring sporting events disestablished in 2011
Sport in Sardinia